This is a list of films which placed number-one at the weekend box office in Chile during 2015. Amounts are in American dollars.

Films

Highest-grossing films

References

2015 in Chile
2015
Chile